The Ellsworth Bumpy Johnson EP is an EP by rapper Prodigy of Mobb Deep. It was released on April 19, 2011. The EP is available for free download on the internet. The EP were serves as the prelude to The Bumpy Johnson Album which was released in 2012.

Track listing

References 

2011 albums
Prodigy (rapper) albums